Arturo Andrés Roig (16 July 1922 – 30 April 2012) was an Argentine philosopher.

Biography 
Born in Mendoza, he entered the Universidad Nacional de Cuyo, and graduated in 1949 with a degree in Education Sciences (Profesor de Enseñanza Secundaria, Normal y Especial en Filosofía). Roig continued his studies at the Sorbonne.

He returned to Argentina, and in 1955 he began teaching philosophy at the Universidad Nacional de Cuyo, with a special interest in local philosophers. This interest subsequently expanded to national and Latin American philosophers. Roig also studied German philosopher Karl Christian Friedrich Krause, and authored his first book on the pantheist thinker's influence in Argentina.

He is famous for being one of the best developed examples of Latin American Philosophy, and for his vast amount of scientific works, for which he has received widespread recognition and awards.

Bibliography

 Los krausistas argentinos (1969)
 El espiritualismo argentino entre 1850 y 1900 (1972)
 Platón o la filosofía como libertad y espectativa (1972)
 Esquemas para una historia de la filosofía ecuatoriana (1977)
 Teoría y crítica del pensamiento latinoamericano (1981)
 Filosofía, universidad y filósofos en América Latina (1981)
 El pensamiento social de Juan Montalvo (1984)
 El Humanismo ecuatoriano de la segunda mitad del siglo XVIII (1984)
 Bolivarismo y filosofía latinoamericana (1984)
 Narrativa y cotidianidad (1984)
 El pensamiento latinoamericano del siglo XIX (1986)
 La utopía del Ecuador (1987)
 Pensamiento filosófico de Hernán Malo González (1989)
 Historia de las ideas, teoría del discurso y pensamiento latinoamericano (1991)
  (1993)
 El pensamiento latinoamericano y su aventura (1994)
 Ética del poder y moralidad de la protesta (1996)
 La universidad cacia la democracia (1998)

Awards
Argentina
 Distinción General José de San Martín (1994)
  (1994) - Universidad Nacional del Comahue
 Doctor Honoris Causa (1996) - Universidad Nacional de Río Cuarto
 Premio Konex 1996: Ética

Cuba
 Visitante ilustre de la Universidad de las Villas (1993)

Ecuador
 Condecoración al mérito cultural (1983)
 Orden Nacional Honorato Vázquez (1992)
  (1994) - Universidad Andina Simón Bolívar

Nicaragua
 Doctor Honoris Causa (1994) - Universidad Autónoma de Managua

Notes and references

External links
 The Contribution of Arturo Andres Roig to Contemporary Philosophy
 Biography by Carlos Pérez Zavala
 Arturo Andrés Roig (1922-2012) IN MEMORIAM. Obituary on the site of the Facultad de Humanidades of the Universidad de la República, Uruguay.
 Proyecto Ensayo Hispánico Homenaje a Arturo Roig y Arturo Ardao, Edward Demenchónok

1922 births
2012 deaths
People from Mendoza, Argentina
Argentine people of Catalan descent
National University of Cuyo alumni
University of Paris alumni
Argentine philosophers
Academic staff of the National University of Cuyo
Argentine male writers
20th-century Argentine philosophers